Kurzweil is a German-language surname. Notable people with the surname include:

 Adele Kurzweil (1925–1942), Austrian Holocaust victim
 Allen Kurzweil (born 1960), American writer
 Amy Kurzweil (born 1986), American cartoonist
 Arthur Kurzweil (born 1951), American genealogist, scholar of Judaism and writer
 Baruch Kurzweil (1907–1972), Israeli literary critic
 Edith Kurzweil (1925–2016), American writer and editor
 Jaroslav Kurzweil (1926–2022), Czech mathematician
 Max Kurzweil (1867–1916), Austrian painter and printmaker
 Ray Kurzweil (born 1948), American inventor, author and futurist
 Kurzweil Music Systems, company founded by Ray Kurzweil that produces electronic musical instruments
 Kurzweil Educational Systems, company founded by Ray Kurzweil that produces reading and writing software

German-language surnames
Jewish surnames